Serious Fun is a live album by pianist and composer George Gruntz which was recorded in Switzerland in 1989 and released on the Enja label the following year.

Reception

The Allmusic review by Scott Yanow stated "George Gruntz is best known as the leader and arranger of his Concert Jazz Band so this trio date is a real rarity. Gruntz's piano playing, although very much in the tradition, features his own individual voice. ... Gruntz is in excellent form throughout this enjoyable live set".

Track listing
All compositions by George Gruntz except where noted
 "Capricci Cavallereschi" – 8:31
 "Autumn Again!" (Joseph Kosma/George Gruntz, Franco Ambrosetti) – 8:49
 "Death March" – 4:08
 "Cat-a-Dam" – 11:08
 "All-Erigic Blues" (Miles Davis/Gruntz) – 9:39
 "Mike-a-Mouse" – 6:49
 "Fransco's Delight" – 7:07
 "So: What Fun???" (Davis/Gruntz) – 8:38

Personnel
George Gruntz – piano
Mike Richmond – bass
Adam Nussbaum – drums
Franco Ambrosetti – flugelhorn (track 2)

References

George Gruntz live albums
1990 live albums
Enja Records live albums